Dr. Henry A. Wise Jr. High School is a public high school in the Westphalia census-designated place in unincorporated Prince George's County, Maryland, United States, with an Upper Marlboro postal address. A part of the Prince George's County Public Schools, it opened in the Fall of 2006.

Its namesake was doctor Dr. Henry A. Wise Jr., the first African-American doctor admitted to practice at Prince George's Hospital.

History

The total amount of money spent to build the school was $91.8 million, including $6.9 million for the gymnasium. During the design process, PGCPS Chief of Schools Andre J. Hornsby successfully campaigned for the school district to add $6.5 million to the funding for the gym even though some of the members of the PG County Council believed that existing campuses should get the money for refurbishments.

The school was scheduled to open in 2006 with 112 teachers and 1,900 students in grades 9-11. Monica Goldson was the first principal. Wise was constructed to relieve overcrowding in several surrounding high schools, mainly Largo High School (Maryland) and Frederick Douglass High School. The school has a total student capacity of 2,231. The school displaced Northwestern High School, another county school, as the largest high school in Maryland, although it's notable that Northwestern has a higher total student capacity. Wise hosts a Technical Academy signature program.

In 2014 the Steve Harvey Neighborhood Awards gave Wise High the best high school award; the award winner is determined by a vote among a group of people.

The acting principal at Wise is Mr. Jeffery Parker.

Campus
The school is on Brooke Lane, between Brown Station Road and Ritchie Marlboro Road, in the Westphalia census-designated place in unincorporated Prince George's County, Maryland, with an Upper Marlboro postal address.

The school has three computer laboratories, three lecture halls, and a greenhouse. Nick Anderson of The Washington Post wrote that many of the aspects of the design of Wise's campus were similar to that of Charles H. Flowers High School; he wrote that Wise's campus "far surpasses the other 21 major high school campuses in the county" and that only the Flowers main building "comes close to the quality of" the Wise high main building. The school was constructed to become the largest high school in the State of Maryland.

The school also has the largest gymnasium of any non-university school in the Baltimore–Washington metropolitan area. The gymnasium has a capacity of 5,000 seats, making it the largest of any PGCPS school; the gym's second floor has a running track. The attached parking lot has 525 spaces as of 2012. In 2012 The Washington Post reported that area community members complained that the parking lot was too small for use for major events; there was a desire to have the Wise gymnasium used for such events so the county government would not have to rent venues of similar sizes, and therefore spend less money.  The students also have an auxiliary gym as well as rooms for cardio fitness, aerobics, weights, and dance; the dance room has mirrors.

The fine and performing arts facilities include a black box theater, a performing arts center with 950 seats, and a room for vocal music; Nick Anderson of The Washington Post stated that the acoustic system in the performing arts center is "similar to the Music Center at Strathmore in North Bethesda."

Communities served
The school serves: much of Westphalia CDP, the towns of Upper Marlboro and Morningside, a section of the city of District Heights, the CDPs of Marlboro Meadows, Marlboro Village, Melwood, and Queenland, and portions of the Brock Hall, Camp Springs, Clinton, Croom, Forestville, Kettering, and Rosaryville CDPs. In addition it serves the base housing of Joint Base Andrews/Andrews Air Force Base and the associated Andrews AFB CDP. It serves sections of the former Greater Upper Marlboro CDP.

Student performance

From circa 2011 to 2014, the percentage of 9th grade students held back declined by 15%.

Notable alumni

Football
 Ryan Smith (cornerback, born 1993) (2011), is an American football corner back for the Tampa Bay Buccaneers.
 Zach Pascal (2012), is an American football wide receiver for the Philadelphia Eagles.
 Marcus Allen (safety) (2014), is an American football safety for the Pittsburgh Steelers.

Musicians
 Shiloh Dynasty (2016), Shiloh Dynasty is an underground musician and singer known for short song snippets posted on social media platform Vine (service).

References

External links

Wise High School Official Website

"Dr. Henry A. Wise, Jr. High School." Grimm and Parker Architects.

Public high schools in Maryland
Schools in Prince George's County, Maryland
Educational institutions established in 2006
2006 establishments in Maryland